This is a list of notable Azerbaijani film producers, which is arranged alphabetically.

I 
 Rustam Ibragimbekov

K
 Farman Karimzade
 Rauf Khalilov

S
 Abbas Mirza Sharifzadeh

T
 Rza Tahmasib

See also 

 List of film producers
 List of Azerbaijani film directors
 List of Azerbaijani actors
 List of Azerbaijanis

 
Lists of film producers
Film producers